Przytuły may refer to the following places:
Przytuły, Masovian Voivodeship (east-central Poland)
Przytuły, Podlaskie Voivodeship (north-east Poland)
Przytuły, Ełk County in Warmian-Masurian Voivodeship (north Poland)
Przytuły, Olecko County in Warmian-Masurian Voivodeship (north Poland)
Przytuły, Szczytno County in Warmian-Masurian Voivodeship (north Poland)
Przytuły, Węgorzewo County in Warmian-Masurian Voivodeship (north Poland)